is a train station located in Ōmuta, Fukuoka.

Lines 
Nishi-Nippon Railroad
Tenjin Ōmuta Line

Platforms

Adjacent stations

Surrounding area
 Ginsui Station
 Hayamadai Elementary School
 Miike Junior High School
 Hakkō Junior High School
 Omuta Junior and High School
 Ginsui Post Office
 Omuta Driving School
 KS Golf Garden
 Tegama Kitamachi Park
 Shirakawa Hospital
 Japan National Route 208

Railway stations in Fukuoka Prefecture
Railway stations in Japan opened in 1938